This is a list of state leaders in the 14th century (1301–1400) AD, of the Holy Roman Empire.

Main

Holy Roman Empire in Germany

Holy Roman Empire, Kingdom of Germany (complete list, complete list) –
Albert I, King (1298–1308)
Henry VII, Holy Roman Emperor (1312–1313), King (1308–1313)
Frederick the Fair, King (1314–1330)
Louis IV, Holy Roman Emperor (1328–1347), King (1314–1347)
Charles IV, Holy Roman Emperor (1355–1378), King (1346–1378)
Wenceslaus, King (1376–1400)
Rupert, King (1400–1410)

Austrian

Duchy of Austria (complete list) –
Albert I, Duke (1282–1308)
Rudolf III the Good, Duke (1298–1307)
Frederick I the Fair, Duke (1308–1330)
Leopold I the Glorious, Duke (1308–1326)
Albert II the Wise, Duke (1330–1358)
Otto I the Merry, Duke (1330–1339)
Frederick II, Duke (1339–1344)
Leopold II, Duke (1339–1344)
Rudolf IV the Founder, Duke (1358–1365)
Leopold III the Just, Duke (1365–1379)
Albert III the Pigtail, Duke (1365–1395)
Albert IV the Patient, Duke (1395–1404)

Prince-Bishopric of Brixen (complete list) –
, Prince-bishop (1301)
Arnold, Prince-bishop (1302)
, Prince-bishop (1302–1306)
, Prince-bishop (1306–1322)
, Prince-bishop (1322–1322)
, Prince-bishop (1322–1324)
, Prince-bishop (1324–1336)
, Prince-bishop (1336–1363)
, Prince-bishop (1363–1364)
, Prince-bishop (1364–1374)
, Prince-bishop (1374–1376)
, Prince-bishop (1376–1396)
, Prince-bishop (1396–1417)

Duchy of Carinthia (complete list) –
Louis, co-Duke (1295–1305)
Otto III, co-Duke (1295–1310)
Henry VI, Duke (1295–1335)
Otto IV, co-Duke (1335–1339)
Albert II, Duke (1335–1358)
Frederick, co-Duke (1358–1362)
Rudolph II, co-Duke (1358–1365)
Albert III, Duke (1365–1379)
Leopold, Duke (1379–1386)
William, Duke (1386–1406)

Prince-Bishopric of Chur (complete list) –
Siegfried von Gelnhausen, Prince-bishop (1298–1321)
Rudolf III. von Montfort, Prince-bishop (1322–1325)
Johannes I. Pfefferhard, Prince-bishop (1325–1331)
Ulrich V. von Lenzburg, Prince-bishop (1331–1355)
Peter I. Gelyto, Prince-bishop (1356–1368)
Friedrich II. von Erdingen, Prince-bishop (1368–1376)
Johannes II. Ammann (Ministri), Prince-bishop (1376–1388)
Hartmann II. Graf von Werdenberg-Sargans, Prince-bishop (1388–1416)

County of Gorizia (complete list) –
Albert I, Count (1258–1304)
Henry III, Count (1304–1323)
John Henry IV, Count (1323–1338)
Albert III, Count (1338–1374)
Meinhard VI, Count (1338–1385)
Henry V, Count (1338–1362)
Henry VI, Count (1385–1454)

Prince-Archbishopric of Salzburg (complete list) –
Conrad IV of Breitenfurt, Prince-archbishop (1291–1312)
Weichard of Pollheim, Prince-archbishop (1312–1315)
Frederick III of Leibnitz, Prince-archbishop (1315–1338)
Henry of Pirnbrunn, Prince-archbishop (1338–1343)
Ordulf of Wiesseneck, Prince-archbishop (1343–1365)
Pilgrim II of Pucheim, Prince-archbishop (1365–1396)
Gregor Schenk of Osterwitz, Prince-archbishop (1396–1403)

Duchy of Styria (complete list) –
Albert I, Duke (1282–1308)
Rudolph II, Duke (1282–1283)
Rudolph III, Duke (1298–1307)
Leopold I, Duke (1308–1326)
Frederick the Fair, Duke (1308–1330)
Otto the Merry, Duke (1330–1339)
Albert II, Duke (1330–1358)
Rudolph IV, Duke (1358–1365)
Albert III, Duke (1365–1379)
Leopold III, Duke (1365–1386)
William, Duke (1386–1406)

Prince-Bishopric of Trent (complete list) –
Philipp Buonacolsi, Prince-bishop (1289–1303)
Bartholomew Querini, Prince-bishop (1303–1307)
Henry III von Metz, Prince-bishop (1310–1336)
Nikolaus Abrein, Prince-bishop (1338–1347)
Gerard II of Magnoco, Prince-bishop (1347–1348)
John III of Pistoia, Prince-bishop (1348–1349)
Meinhard von Neuhaus, Prince-bishop (1349–1362)
Albert V von Ortenburg, Prince-bishop (1363–1390)
George I von Liechtenstein, Prince-bishop (1390–1419)

County of Tyrol (complete list) –
Louis of Gorizia-Tyrol, co-Count (1295–1305)
Otto, co-Count (1295–1310)
Henry II, Count (1295–1335)
Margaret, Countess (1335–1363)
John Henry, Count (1335–1341)
Louis, Count (1341–1361)
Meinhard III, Count (1361–1363)
Rudolph IV, Count (1363–1365)
Leopold I, Count (1365–1386)
Albert IV, co-Count (1365–1379, 1386–1395)
William, Count (1386–1406)
Leopold II, Regent (1396–1406)

Bavarian

Duchy of Bavaria (complete list) –
Upper Bavaria, Lower Bavaria, Bavaria-Landshut, Bavaria-Straubing, Bavaria-Munich, Bavaria-Ingolstadt
Stephen I, co-Duke of Lower Bavaria (1290–1310)
Otto III, co-Duke of Lower Bavaria (1290–1312)
Matilda, Regent of Upper Bavaria (1294–1302)
Rudolph I, Duke of Upper Bavaria (1294–1317)
Henry XV the Natternberger, co-Duke of Lower Bavaria (1312–1333)
Otto VI, co-Duke of Lower Bavaria (1310–1334)
Henry XIV, co-Duke of Lower Bavaria (1310–1339)
John I the Child, Duke of Lower Bavaria (1339–1340)
Louis IV, Duke of Upper Bavaria (1301–1340), Duke of Bavaria (1340–1347)
Otto V, co-Duke of Bavaria (1347–1949), of Upper Bavaria (1349–1351), of Bavaria-Landshut (1373–1379)
Louis V the Brandenburger, co-Duke of Bavaria (1347–1349), of Upper Bavaria (1349–1361)
Meinhard I, Duke of Upper Bavaria (1361–1363)
Louis VI, co-Duke of Bavaria (1347–1365)
Stephen II, co-Duke of Bavaria (1347–1349), of Lower Bavaria (1349–1353), of Bavaria-Landshut (1353–1375), of Upper Bavaria (1363)
William I, co-Duke of Bavaria (1347–1349), of Lower Bavaria (1349–1353), of Bavaria-Straubing (1353–1388)
Ernest, co-Duke of Bavaria-Munich (1397–1438), of Bavaria-Straubing (1429–1438)
Albert I, co-Duke of Bavaria (1347–1349), of Lower Bavaria (1349–1353), of Bavaria-Straubing (1353–1404)
Albert II, co-Duke of Bavaria-Straubing (1389–1397)
Frederick I the Wise, co-Duke of Bavaria except Straubing (1375–1392), Duke of Bavaria-Landshut (1392–1393)
John II, co-Duke of Bavaria except Straubing (1375–1392), Duke of Bavaria-Munich (1392–1397)
Stephen III the Magnificent, co-Duke of Bavaria except Straubing (1375–1392), Duke of Bavaria-Ingolstadt (1392–1413)
Henry XVI the Rich, Duke of Bavaria-Landshut (1393–1450), of Bavaria-Ingolstadt (1447–1450)

Berchtesgaden Prince-Provostry (complete list) –
Johann I Sachs von Sachsenau, Provost (1283–1303)
Hartung von Wildon, Provost (1303–1306)
Eberhard Sachs von Sachsenau, Provost (1306–1316)
Konrad IV Tanner, Provost (1316–1333)
Heinrich IV von Inzing, Provost (1333–1351)
Reinhold Zeller, Provost (1351–1355)
Otto Tanner, Provost (1355–1357)
Peter I Pfaffinger, Provost (1357–1362)
Jakob I von Vansdorf, Provost (1362–1368)
Greimold Wulp, Provost (1368–1377)
Ulrich I Wulp, co-Provost (1377–1384)
Sieghard Waller, co-Provost (1381–1384)
Konrad V Thorer von Thörlein, Provost (1384–1393)
Pilgrim von Puchheim, Provost (1393–1396)
Gregorius Schenk von Osterwitz, Provost (1396–1403)

Prince-Bishopric of Freising (complete list) –
Waldgrave Emicho, Prince-bishop (1294–1311)
Gottfried of Hexenagger, Prince-bishop (1311–1314)
Conrad III the Sendlinger, Prince-bishop (1314–1322)
John I Wulfing, Prince-bishop (1323–1324)
Conrad IV of Klingenberg, Prince-bishop (1324–1340)
John II Hake, Prince-bishop (1340–1349)
Albert II of Hohenberg, Prince-bishop (1349–1359)
Paul of Jägerndorf, Prince-bishop (1359–1377)
Leopold of Sturmberg, Prince-bishop (1377–1381)
Berthold of Wehingen, Prince-bishop (1381–1410)

Landgraviate of Leuchtenberg (de:complete list) –
, Landgrave (1293–1334)
Ulrich II, Landgrave (1344–1378)
John I, Landgrave (1334–1407)
Albrecht I, Landgrave (1378–1404)

Duchy of Limburg (complete list) –
John II, Duke (1294–1312)
John III, Duke (1312–1355)
Joanna, Duchess (1355–1406)

Prince-Abbey of Niedermünster (complete list) –
Adelheid II von Treidenberg, Abbess (1300–1304)
Irmgard II von Köfering, Abbess (1304–1314)
Euphemia von Winzer, Abbess (1314–1333)
Elisabeth II von Eschen, Abbess (1333–1340)
Petrissa von Weidenberg, Abbess (1340–1353)
Margarethe I Gösslin von Altenburg, Abbess (1353–1361)
Margarethe II Pinzingerin, Abbess (1361–1365)
Elisabeth III von Rhein, Abbess (1365–1391)
Sophia von Daching, Abbess (1391–1410)

Prince-Abbey of Obermünster (complete list) –
Bertha Walterin, Abbess (?–1325)
Adelheid von Arenbach, Abbess (?)
Katharina von Murach, Abbess (?)
Agnes I von Wunebach, Abbess (?–1374)
Elisabeth I von Parsberg, Abbess (1374–1400)
Elisabeth II von Murach, Abbess (1400–1402)

Imperial County of Ortenburg (complete list) –
Henry III, Count (1297/1321–1345)
Henry IV, Count (1346–1395)
George I, Count of Neu-Ortenburg (1395–1422), Imperial Count (1395–1422)

Prince-Bishopric of Passau (complete list) –
Bernhard of Prambach, Prince-Bishop (1285–1313)
Albert II, Duke of Austria, Prince-Bishop (1313)
Gebhard II, Prince-Bishop (1313–1315)
Henri de la Tour-du-Pin, Prince-Bishop (1317–1319)
Albert II of Saxe-Wittenberg, Prince-Bishop (1320–1342)
Gottfried of Weißeneck, Prince-Bishop (1342–1362)
Albert III of Winkel, Prince-Bishop (1363–1380)
Johann of Scharffenberg, Prince-Bishop (1381–1387)
Hermann Digni, Prince-Bishop (1387–1388)
Rupert of Berg, Prince-Bishop (1388–1390)
George of Hohenlohe, Prince-Bishop (1390–1423)

Pappenheim (complete list) –
Henry IV, Lord (1278–1318)
Rudolph I, Lord (1313–1335)
Rudolph II, Lord (1335–1345)
Henry V, Lord (1345–1387)
Haupt I, Lord (1387–1409)

Prince-Bishopric of Regensburg (complete list) –
Konrad V von Luppurg, Prince-bishop (1296–1313)
Nikolaus von Ybbs, Prince-bishop (1313–1340)
Friedrich von Zollern-Nürnberg, Prince-bishop (1340–1365)
Heinrich III von Stein, Prince-bishop (1365–1368)
Konrad VI von Haimberg, Prince-bishop (1368–1381)
Theoderich von Abensberg, Prince-bishop (1381–1383)
Johann von Moosburg, Prince-bishop (1384–1409)

Bohemian

Kingdom of Bohemia (complete list) –
Wenceslaus II, King (1278–1305)
Wenceslaus III, King (1305–1306)
Henry the Carinthian, King (1306, 1307–1310)
Rudolph I, King (1306–1307)
John the Blind, King (1310–1346)
Charles IV, King (1346–1378)
Wenceslaus IV, King (1378–1419)

Margraviate of Moravia (complete list) –
Wenceslaus II, Margrave (1283–1305)
Wenceslaus III, Margrave (1305–1306)
Rudolf I of Habsburg, Margrave (1306–1307)
Henry of Carinthia, Margrave (1307–1310)
John, Margrave (1310–1333)
Charles, Margrave (1333–1349)
John Henry, Margrave (1349–1375)
Jobst of Moravia, Margrave (1375–1411)

Duchy of Teschen (Cieszyn) (complete list) –
Mieszko I, Duke (1290–1315)
Casimir I, Duke (1315–1358)
Przemyslaus I Noszak, Duke (1358–1410)

Burgundian-Low Countries

County of Burgundy (complete list) –
Otto IV, Count (1279–1303)
Joan II, Countess (1303–1330)
Philip II the Tall, Count (1307–1322)
Joan III, Countess, and Odo V, Count (1330–1347)
Philip III of Rouvres, Count (1347–1361)
Margaret I, Countess (1361–1382)
Louis I of Mâle, Count (1382–1384)
Margaret II of Dampierre, Count (1384–1405)

Duchy of Brabant (complete list) –
John II, Duke (1294–1312)
John III, Duke (1312–1355)
Joanna, Duchess (1355–1406)

County of Flanders (complete list) –
Guy I, Count (1251–1305)
Robert III, Count (1305–1322)
Louis I, Count (1322–1346)
Louis II, Count (1346–1384)
Margaret III, Countess, and Philip II, Count (1384–1405)

County of Hainaut (complete list) –
John II, Count (1280–1304)
William I, Count (1304–1337)
William II, Count (1337–1345)
Margaret II, Countess (1345–1356) with Louis (1345–1347)
William III, Count (1356–1388)
Albert I, Count (1388–1404)

County of Holland (complete list) –
John II, Count of Hainaut, Regent (1299), Count (1299–1304)
William III, Count (1304–1337)
William IV the Bold, Count (1337–1345)
Margaret I, Count (1345–1354)
Louis the Bavarian, Count (1345–1347)
William V, Count (1354–1388)
Albert I, Count (1388–1404)

Duchy of Limburg (complete list) –
John II, Duke (1294–1312)
John III, Duke (1312–1355)
Joanna, Duchess (1355–1406)

County of Namur (complete list) –
John I, Margrave (1297–1330)
John II, Margrave (1330–1335)
Guy II, Margrave (1335–1336)
Philip III, Margrave (1336–1337)
William I, Margrave (1337–1391)
William II, Margrave (1391–1418)

Franconian

Prince-Bishopric of Bamberg (complete list) –
Leopold I von Grundlach, Prince-bishop (1296–1303)
Wulfing von Stubenberg, Prince-bishop (1304–1318)
Ulrich von Schlusselberg, Prince-bishop (1319)
Konrad von Giech, Prince-bishop (1319–1322)
Johannes von Schlackenwerth, Prince-bishop (1322–1324)
Heinrich II von Sternberg, Prince-bishop (1324–1328)
Werntho Schenk von Reicheneck, Prince-bishop (1328–1335)
Leopold II von Egloffstein, Prince-bishop (1335–1343)
Friedrich I von Hohenlohe, Prince-bishop (1344–1352)
Leopold III of Bebenburg, Prince-bishop (1353–1363)
Friedrich II von Truhendingen, Prince-bishop (1363–1366)
Louis of Meissen, Prince-bishop (1366–1374)
Lamprecht von Brunn, Prince-bishop (1374–1399)
Albrecht von Wertheim, Prince-bishop (1399–1421)

Brandenburg-Kulmbach (Brandenburg-Bayreuth) (complete list) –
John III, Margrave (1398–1420)

Brandenburg-Ansbach (complete list) –
Frederick I, Elector (1415–1440), Margrave of Brandenburg-Ansbach (1398–1440), of Brandenburg-Kulmbach (1420–1440)

County of Castell, Elder Line (complete list) –
Henry II, Count (1254–1307)
Rupert II, Count (1307–1334)
Henry III, Count (1334–1347)

County of Castell, Younger Line (complete list) –
Frederick IV Count of Younger Line (1285–1347), Count (1347–1349)

County of Castell (complete list) –
Frederick IV Count of Younger Line (1285–1347), Count (1347–1349)
Herman IV, Count (1349–1363)
Frederick VII, Count (1349–1376)
John I, Count (1363–1384)
William I, Count (1363–1399)
Leonard, Count (1399–1426)

Prince-Bishopric of Eichstätt (complete list, de) –
, Prince-bishop (1305–1306)
, Prince-bishop (1306–1322)
, Prince-bishop (1322–1324)
, Prince-bishop (1324–1327)
, Prince-bishop (1328–1329)
, Prince-bishop (1329–1344)
, Prince-bishop (1344–1353)
, Prince-bishop (1355–1365)
, Prince-bishop (1365–1383)
Frederick IV of Oettingen, Prince-bishop (1383–1415)

Prince-Bishopric of Würzburg (complete list) –
Mangold von Neuenburg, Prince-bishop (1287–1303)
Andreas von Gundelfingen, Prince-bishop (1303–1313)
Gottfried III von Hohenlohe, Prince-bishop (1313–1322)
Friedrich von Stolberg, Prince-bishop (1313–1317)
Wolfram Wolfskeel von Grumbach, Prince-bishop (1322–1332)
Hermann II Hummel von Lichtenberg, Prince-bishop (1333–1335)
Otto II von Wolfskeel, Prince-bishop (1335–1345)
Albrecht I von Hohenberg, Prince-bishop (1345–1349)
Albrecht II von Hohenlohe, Prince-bishop (1350–1372)
Albrecht III von Katzburg, Prince-bishop (1372–1376)
Gerhard von Schwarzburg, Prince-bishop (1372–1400)
Johann I von Egloffstein, Prince-bishop (1400–1411)

Electoral Rhenish

Elector-Archbishopric of Cologne (complete list) –
Wikbold I von Holte, Archbishop-elector (1297–1304)
Heinrich II von Virneburg, Archbishop-elector (1304–1332)
Walram von Jülich, Archbishop-elector (1332–1349)
Wilhelm von Gennep, Archbishop-elector (1349–1362)
Adolf II von der Marck, Archbishop-elector (1363–1363)
Engelbert III von der Marck, Archbishop-elector (1364–1369)
Kuno von Falkenstein, Archbishop-elector (1370–1371)
Friedrich III von Saarwerden, Archbishop-elector (1372–1414)

Elector-Bishopric of Mainz (complete list) –
Peter of Aspelt, Archbishop-elector (1306–1320)
Matthias von Bucheck, Archbishop-elector (1321–1328)
Heinrich III von Virneberg, Archbishop-elector (1328–1337)
Baldwin of Luxembourg, Administrator-elector (1328–1336, administrator)
Gerlach von Nassau, Archbishop-elector (1346–1371)
Johann I von Luxemburg-Ligny, Archbishop-elector (1371–1373)
Louis of Meissen, Archbishop-elector (1374–1379)
Adolf I von Nassau, Archbishop-elector (1379–1390)
Konrad II von Weinsberg, Archbishop-elector (1390–1396)
Joffrid von Leiningen, Archbishop-elector (1396–1397)
Johann II von Nassau, Archbishop-elector (1397–1419)

Nieder-Isenburg (Lower Isenburg) (complete list) –
Salentin II, Count (1300–1334)
Salentin III, Count (1319–1370)
Salentin IV, Count (1370–1420)

County Palatine of the Rhine/ Electoral Palatinate (complete list) –
Rudolph I the Stammerer, Count (1296–1317)
Rudolph II the Blind, Count (1327–1353)
Robert I the Red, Count (1353–1356), Elector (1356–1390)
Robert II the Hard, Elector (1390–1398)
Robert III the Righteous, Elector (1398–1410)

Elector-Bishopric of Trier (complete list) –
Diether von Nassau, Archbishop-elector (1300–1307)
Heinrich II von Virneburg, Archbishop-elector (1300–1306, in opposition)
Baldwin von Luxemburg, Archbishop-elector (1307–1354)
Bohemond II von Saarbrücken, Archbishop-elector (1354–1361)
Kuno II von Falkenstein, Archbishop-elector (1362–1388)
Werner von Falkenstein, Archbishop-elector (1388–1417)

Lower Rhenish–Westphalian

Bentheim-Bentheim (complete list) –
Egbert, Count (1277–1305)
John, Count (1305–1333)
Simon, Count (1333–1348)
Otto III, Count (1348–1364)
Bernard I, Count (1364–1421)

Bentheim-Tecklenburg (complete list) –
Otto III, Count (1277–1338)
Otto IV, Count (1289–1302)
Otto V, Count (1302–1328)
Richardis, Count (1328–1338)
Nicholas I, Count (1338–1360)
Otto VI, Count (1360–1388)
Nicholas II, Count (1388–1426)

County/ Duchy of Cleves (complete list) –
Dietrich VII of Meissen, Count (1275–1305)
Otto I the Peaceable, Count (1305–1310)
Dietrich VIII the Pious, Count (1310–1347)
Johann, Count (1347–1368)
Adolf III of the Marck, Count (1368–1394)
Adolph I, Duke (1394–1448)

Princely Abbey of Corvey (de:complete list) –
Heinrich III. von Homburg, Prince-abbot (1275–1306)
Ruprecht von Horhausen, Prince-abbot (1306–1336)
Dietrich I von Dalwigk, Prince-abbot (1336–1359)
, Prince-abbot (1359–1360)
Reinhard I von Dalwigk, Prince-abbot (1360–1369)
, Prince-abbot (1369–1371)
Bodo von Pyrmont, Prince-abbot (1371–1395)
Dietrich II von Runst, Prince-abbot (1395–1396)
Arnold II Wolff von Gudenberg, Prince-abbot (1396–1398)
, Prince-abbot (1398–1408)

Essen Abbey (complete list) –
Beatrix von Holte, Princess-Abbess (1292–1327)
Kunigunde of Berg, Princess-Abbess (1327–1337)
Katharina of the Mark, Princess-Abbess (1337–1360)
Irmgard of Broich, Princess-Abbess (1360–1370)
Elisabeth III of Nassau, Princess-Abbess (1370–?)

County/ Duchy of Guelders (complete list) –
Reginald I, Count (1271–1318)
Reginald II, Count (1318–1339), Duke (1339–1343)
Eleanor, Regent (1343–1344)
Reginald III, Duke (1343–1361, 1371)
Edward, Duke (1361–1371)
Mathilde of Guelders and John II, disputed the succession (1371–1379)
Maria and William II, Duke of Jülich, disputed the succession (1371–1379)
William I, Duke (1379–1402)

Herford Abbey (complete list) –
Irmgard of Wittgenstein, Abbess (pre-1290–1323)
Lutgard II of Bicken, Abbess (1324–1360)
Heilwig of Bentheim, Abbess (1361)
Elisabeth I of Berg, Abbess (1361–1374)
Hillegund of Oetgenbach, Abbess (1374–1409)

Isenburg-Wied –
William II, Count of Isenburg-Braunsberg (1383–1388), of Isenburg-Wied (1388–1409)

Prince-Bishopric of Liège (complete list) –
Hugh of Chalon, Prince-Bishop (1295–1301)
Adolph of Waldeck, Prince-Bishop (1301–1302)
Thibaut of Bar, Prince-Bishop (1302–1312)
Adolph of La Marck, Prince-Bishop (1313–1344)
Englebert of La Marck, Prince-Bishop (1345–1364)
John of Arkel, Prince-Bishop (1364–1378)
Arnold of Horne, Prince-Bishop (1378–1389)
John of Bavaria, Prince-Bishop (1389–1418)

County/ Duchy of Luxemburg (complete list) –
Henry VII, Count (1288–1313)
John I, Count (1313–1346)
Charles I, Count (1346–1353)
Wenceslaus I, Count (1353–1354), Duke (1354–1383)
Wenceslaus II, Duke (1383–1388)
Jobst, Duke (1388–1411)

County of Mark (complete list) –
Eberhard II, Count (1277–1308)
Engelbert II, Count (1308–1328)
Adolph II, Count (1328–1347)
Engelbert III, Count (1347–1391)
Adolph III, Count (1391–1393)
Dietrich, Count (1393–1398)
Adolph IV, Count (1398–1448)

Prince-Bishopric of Münster (complete list) –
Everhard of Diest, Prince-bishop (1275–1301)
Otto III of Rietberg, Prince-bishop (1301–1306)
Conrad I of Berg, Prince-bishop (1306–1310)
Ludwig II of Hesse, Prince-bishop (1310–1357)
Adolf III of the March, Prince-bishop (1357–1363)
John I of Virneburg, Prince-bishop (1363–1364)
Florence of Wevelinghoven, Prince-bishop (1364–1378)
Potho of Pothenstein, Prince-bishop (1379–1382)
Heidenreich Wolf of Lüdinghausen, Prince-bishop (1382–1392)
Otto IV of Hoya, Prince-bishop (1392–1424)

County of Oldenburg (complete list) –
Otto II, Count of Oldenburg-Delmenhorst, Count (1272–1301)
John II, Count (1278–1305)
Christian IV, Count (1302–1323)
John III, Count (1305–1345)
John IV, Count (1331–1356)
Conrad I, Count (1345–1368)
Conrad II, Count (1368–1386)
Maurice II, Count (1386–1420)
Christian V, Count (1368–1398)
Christian VI, Count (1398–1423)

Prince-Bishopric of Osnabrück (complete list) –
Ludwig von Ravensberg, Prince-bishop (1297–1308)
Engelbert II von Weyhe, Prince-bishop (1309–1320)
, Prince-bishop (1321–1349)
Johann II Hoet, Prince-bishop (1350–1366)
Melchior von Braunschweig-Grubenhagen, Prince-bishop (1366–1376)
Dietrich of Horne, Prince-bishop (1376–1402)

Prince-Bishopric of Paderborn (complete list) –
Bernhard V, Prince-bishop (1321–1341)
, Prince-bishop (1341–1361)
, Prince-bishop (1361–1380)
, Prince-bishop (1380–1389)
, Prince-bishop (1389–1394)
, Prince-bishop (1394–1399)
Bertrando d'Arvazzano, Prince-bishop (1399–1401)

County of Runkel (complete list) –
Theodoric II, Count (1305–1325)
Henry, Count (1351–1361)
Theodoric III, Count (1370–1403)
Siegfried, co-Count (1375–1388)

Sayn (complete list) –
John I, Count (1283–1324)
John II, Count (1324–1359)
John III, Count (1359–1403)

County of Schaumburg (complete list) –
Adolph VI the Elder, Count (1290–1315)
, Count (1315–1354)
, Count (1354–1370)
, Count (1370–1404)

Prince-Bishopric of Utrecht (complete list) –
Willem II Berthout, Prince-bishop (1296–1301)
Guy van Avennes, Prince-bishop (1301–1317)
Frederik II van Sierck, Prince-bishop (1317–1322)
Jacob van Oudshoorn, Prince-bishop (1322)
Jan III van Diest, Prince-bishop (1322–1340)
Jan IV van Arkel (1342–1364)
Jan V van Virneburg, Prince-bishop (1364–1371)
Arnold II of Horne, Prince-bishop (1371–1379)
Floris van Wevelinkhoven, Prince-bishop (1379–1393)
Frederik III van Blankenheim, Prince-bishop (1393–1423)

Prince-Bishopric of Verden (complete list) –
Nicolaus Ketelhot, Prince-Bishop (1312–1332)
Johannes Hake , Prince-Bishop (1332–1340)
Daniel of Wichtrich, Prince-Bishop (1342–1363)
Gerard of Schalksberg, Prince-Bishop (1363–1365)
Rudolf Rühle, Prince-Bishop (1365–1367)
Henry of Langlingen, Prince-Bishop (1367–1381)
John Gryse of Zesterfleth, Prince-Bishop (1381–1388)
Otto of Brunswick and Lunenburg (Wolfenbüttel), Prince-Bishop (1388–1395)
Dietrich of Nieheim, Prince-Bishop (1395–1398/1401)
Conrad of Vechta, Prince-Bishop (1398–1399)
Conrad of Soltau, Prince-Bishop (1399–1400, 1402–1407)

Upper Rhenish

County/ Duchy of Bar (complete list) –
Henry III, Count (1291–1302)
Edward I, Count (1302–1337)
Henry IV, Count (1337–1344)
Edward II, Count (1344–1352)
Robert, Duke (1352–1411)

Prince-Bishopric of Basel (complete list) –
Peter von Aspelt, Prince-bishop (1297–1306)
Eudes de Granson, Prince-bishop (1306–1309)
Gerhard von Wippingen, Prince-bishop (1309–1325)
Hartung Münch, Prince-bishop (1325–1332)
Jean I Arley, Prince-bishop (1332–1335)
Johann II of Munsingen, Prince-bishop (1335–1365)
Jean III de Vienne, Prince-bishop (1365–1382)
Imer von Ramstein, Prince-bishop (1382–1391)
Frederick of Blankenheim, Prince-bishop (1391–1393)
Konrad Munch von Landskron, Prince-bishop (1393–1395)
Humbrecht von Neuenburg, Prince-bishop (1399–1418)

Free City of Frankfurt (de:complete list) –
, Stadtschultheißen (1376–1379)
Winter von Wasen, Stadtschultheißen (?–1389)
Rudolf III. von Praunheim-Sachsenhausen, Stadtschultheißen (1389–1408)

Princely Abbey of Fulda (complete list) –
, Prince-abbot (1288–1313)
, Prince-abbot (1313–1315)
, Prince-abbot (1315–1353)
, Prince-abbot (1353–1372)
, Prince-abbot (1372–1383)
Friedrich I. von Romrod, Prince-abbot (1383–1395)
, Prince-abbot (1395–1440)

Landgraviate of Hesse (complete list) –
Henry I the Child, Landgrave (1264–1308)
John I, Landgrave of Lower Hesse (1308–1311)
Otto I the Elder, Landgrave of Upper Hesse (1308–1311), of Hesse (1311–1328)
Henry II the Iron, co-Landgrave (1328–1376)
Louis I the Junker, co-Landgrave (1336–1345)
de:Herman I the Elder, co-Landgrave (1336–1370)
de:Otto II the Younger, co-Landgrave (1336–1366)
Herman II the Learned, Landgrave (1376–1413)

Isenburg-Arnfels (complete list) –
Gerlach I, Count (1286–1303)
Theodoric, Count (1303–1333)
John, Count (1305–1319)
Gerlach II, Count (1333–1379)

Isenburg-Braunsberg (complete list) –
John I, Count (1278–1327)
William I, Count (1327–1383)
William II, Count (1383–1388)

Isenburg-Covern (complete list) –
Robin, Count (1272–1306)

Isenburg-Grenzau (complete list) –
Philip I, Count (1341–1361)
Eberhard II, Count (1361–1399)
Philip II, Count (1399–1439)

Isenburg-Kempenich (complete list) –
Gerard I, Count (13th/14th century)
Theodoric IV, Count (?–1329)
Theodoric V the Arsonist, Count (1329–1330)
Gerard II, Count (1329–1330)
Simon I, Count (1329–1341)
Simon II, Count (1341–1367)
Henry, Count (1367)
Simon III, Count (1367–1420)

Isenburg-Limburg (complete list) –
John I the Blind Lord, Count (1289–1312/19)
Gerlach V the Elder, Count (1312/19–1355)
Gerlach VI the Younger, Count (1355–1365)
John II, Count (1365–1406)

County of Leiningen (de:complete list) –
Friedrich IV, Count (c.1287–1316)
divided into Leiningen-Dagsburg and Leiningen-Hartenburg

Leiningen-Dagsburg –
Friedrich VI, Count (1316–1327)
Friedrich VII, Count (1327–pre-1342)
Friedrich VIII, Count (pre-1342–1387)

Leiningen-Hardenburg (de:complete list) –
Gottfried, Count (1316–14th century)
Emich V, Count (14th century)

Duchy of Lorraine (complete list) –
Frederick III, Duke (1251–1302)
Theobald II, Duke (1302–1312)
Frederick IV, Duke (1312–1329)
Raoul, Duke (1329–1346)
John I, Duke (1346–1390)
Charles II, Duke (1390–1431)

County of Nassau-Beilstein –
Henry I, Count (1343–1388)
Henry II, co-Count (1388–1410)
Reinhard, co-Count (1388–1412)

Nassau-Weilburg (complete list) –
John I, Count (1344–1371)
Philip I, Count (1371–1429)

Nassau-Saarbrücken (complete list) –
Simon IV, Count (1271–1308)
John I, Count (1308–1342)
John II, Count (1342–1381)
Joan, Countess (1381)
Philip I, Count (1381–1429)

Lower Salm (complete list) –
Henry V, Count (1297–1336)
Henry VI, Count (1336–1362)
John, Count (1362–1370)
Henry VII, Count (1370–1416)

Upper Salm (complete list) –
John I, Count (1293–1326)
Nicolas, Count (1326–1343)
John II, Count (1343–1351)
Simon I, Count (1351–1360)
John III, Count (1360–1386)
Simon II, Count (1386–1397)
John IV, Count (1397–1431)

Salm-Blankenburg (complete list) –
Henry I, Count (1270–1301)
Henry II, Count (1301–1361)
Theobald I, Count (1361–1363)
Henry III, Count (1363–1382)
Theobald II, Count (1382–1396)
Henry IV, Count (1396–1441)

Prince-Bishopric of Sion (complete list) –
Boniface of Challant, Prince-Bishop (1289–1308)
Aymon of Châtillon, Prince-Bishop (1308–1323)
Aymon of La Tour, Prince-Bishop (1323–1338)
Philippe of Chamberlhac, Prince-Bishop (1338–1342)
Guichard Tavelli, Prince-Bishop (1342–1375)
Édouard of Savoy, Prince-Bishop (1375–1386)
loyal to Avignon
Guillaume of La Baume-Saint-Amourb, Prince-Bishop, loyal to Avignon (1386)
Robert Chambrier, Prince-Bishop, loyal to Avignon (1387)
Humbert de Billens, Prince-Bishop, loyal to Avignon (1388–1392)
Aymon Séchala, Prince-Bishop, loyal to Avignon (1398–1404)
loyal to Rome
Gerardus, Prince-Bishop, loyal to Rome (1387–1388)
Henri de Blanchis, Prince-Bishop, loyal to Rome(1392–1393)
Guillaume IV, Prince-Bishop, loyal to Rome(1394–1402)

Solms-Braunfels (complete list) –
Henry III, Count (1258–1312)
Bernhard I, Count (1312–1349)
Otto I, Count (1349–1410)

Prince-Bishopric of Speyer (complete list) –
Friedrich of Bolanden, Prince-bishop (1272–1302)
Sigibodo of Lichtenberg, Prince-bishop (1302–1314)
Emich of Leiningen, Prince-bishop (1314–1328)
Berthold of Bucheck, Prince-bishop (1328–1328)
Walram of Veldenz, Prince-bishop (1328–1336)
Baldwin, Archbishop of Trier, Administrator (1332–1336)
Gerhard of Ehrenberg, Prince-bishop (1336–1363)
Lambert of Born (Brunn?), Prince-bishop (1364–1371)
Adolf I, Count of Nassau, Prince-bishop (1371–1388)
Nikolaus I aus Wiesbaden, Prince-bishop (1388–1396)

Prince-Bishopric of Strasbourg (complete list) –
Friedrich I von Lichtenberg, Prince-Bishop (1299–1306)
Johann I von Dürbheim, Prince-Bishop (1307–1328)
Berthold II of Bucheck, Prince-Bishop (1328–1353)
Johann II von Lichtenberg, Prince-Bishop (1353–1365)
Johann III von Luxemburg-Ligny, Prince-Bishop (1366–1371)
Lamprecht of Brunn, Prince-Bishop (1371–1374)
Friedrich II von Blankenheim, Prince-Bishop (1375–1393)
Ludwig von Thierstein, Prince-Bishop (1393)
Burkhard II von Lützelstein, Prince-Bishop (1393–1394)
Wilhelm II von Diest, Prince-Bishop (1394–1439)

County of Waldeck –
Otto II, Count (1344–1369)
Henry VI, Count (1369–1397)

County of Waldeck-Landau, Older Line –
Adolph III, Count (1397–1431)

County of Waldeck-Waldeck –
Henry VII, Count (1397–c.1444)

Prince-Bishopric of Worms (complete list) –
Eberwin von Kronenberg, Prince-bishop (1300–1308)
sede vacante, Prince-bishop (1309–1310 )
Baldwin of Luxembourg, Diocesan administrator (1309–1310)
Emeric von Schoneck, Prince-bishop (1310–1318)
Heinrich III of Dhaun, Prince-bishop (1318–1319)
Konrad IV von Schoneck, Prince-bishop (1319–1329)
Gerlach von Erbach, Prince-bishop (1329–1332)
Salomon Waldbott, Prince-bishop (1332–1350)
Dietrich I Bayer von Boppard, Prince-bishop (1350–1365)
Johann Schadland, Prince-bishop (1365–1370)
Echard von Dersch, Prince-bishop (1370–1405)

Lower Saxon

Prince-Archbishopric of Bremen (complete list) –
Gilbert of Brunckhorst, Prince-archbishop (1274–1306)
Henry I, Prince-archbishop elect (1306–1307)
Florence, Prince-archbishop elect (1307)
Bernard of Wölpe, Prince-archbishop elect (1307)
John I, Prince-archbishop (1310–1316)
John of Brunswick and Lunenburg (Celle line), Administrator (1316–1324)
Nicolaus Ketelhot, Administrator (1324–1327)
Burchard II, Prince-archbishop (1327–1344)
Otto I, Prince-archbishop (1344–1348)
Maurice of Oldenburg Administrator (1345–1360/62)
Albert II, Prince-archbishop (1360–1395)
Otto II, Prince-archbishop (1395–1406)

Principality of Brunswick-Wolfenbüttel/ Principality of Wolfenbüttel (complete list) –
Albert II the Fat, Prince of Brunswick-Wolfenbüttel (1279–1291, 1292–1318), of Göttingen (1286–1318)
Otto the Mild, co-Prince (1318–1344)
Ernest I, co-Prince of Brunswick-Wolfenbüttel (1318–1344), Prince of Göttingen (1344–1367)
Magnus the Pious, co-Prince of Brunswick-Wolfenbüttel (1318–1344), of Wolfenbüttel (1344–1369)
Magnus II of the Necklace, Prince of Lüneburg (1369–1373), Prince of Brunswick-Wolfenbüttel (1369–1373)
Frederick I, Prince (1373–1400)
Henry I the Mild, co-Prince of Lüneburg (1388–1416), co-Prince of Brunswick-Wolfenbüttel (1400–1409)
Bernard I, co-Prince of Lunenburg (1388–1409, 1428–1434), Prince of Brunswick-Wolfenbüttel (1400–1428)

Gandersheim Abbey (complete list) –
Margarete I, Princess-Abbess (1253–1305)
Mechthild II, Princess-Abbess (1305–1316)
Sophia II, Princess-Abbess (1317–1331)
Jutta, Princess-Abbess (1331–1357)
Ermegardis, Princess-Abbess (1357–1358)
Lutgard III, Princess-Abbess (1359–1402)

Principality of Göttingen (complete list) –
Albert II the Fat, Prince of Brunswick-Wolfenbüttel (1279–1291, 1292–1318), of Göttingen (1286–1318)
Ernest I, co-Prince of Brunswick-Wolfenbüttel (1318–1344), Prince of Göttingen (1344–1367)
Otto the Evil, Prince (1367–1394)
Otto II the One-eyed, Prince (1394–1463)

Principality of Grubenhagen (complete list) –
Henry I the Admirable, co-Prince of Brunswick-Wolfenbüttel (1279–1291), Prince of Grubenhagen (1291–1322)
Henry II, co-Prince (1322–1325)
John I, co-Prince (1322–1325)
William, co-Prince (1322–1360)
Ernest I, co-Prince (1322–1361)
John II, co-Prince (1361–1364)
Albert I, Prince (1361–1383)
Eric, co-Prince (1383–1427)

Prince-Bishopric of Hildesheim (complete list) –
Siegfried II of Querfurt, Prince-bishop (1279–1310)
, Prince-bishop (1310–1318)
, Prince-bishop (1318–1331)
Henry III of Brunswick-Lüneburg, Prince-bishop (1331–1363)
Eric I of Schauenburg, Prince-bishop (1332–1349)
, Prince-bishop (1363–1365)
Gerhard vom Berge, Prince-bishop (1365–1398)
, Prince-bishop (1399–1424)

Holstein-Kiel (complete list) –
John II the One-Eyed, co-Count of Holstein-Kiel (1263–1273), Count (1273–1316)
John III the Mild, Count of Holstein-Plön (1312–1316, 1350–1359), of Holstein-Kiel (1316–1359)
Adolph IX the Mild, Count (1359–1390)

Holstein-Pinneberg (Holstein-Schaumburg) (complete list) –
Adolph VI the Elder, Count (1290–1315)
, Count (1315–1353)
, Count (1353–1370)
, Count (1370–1404)

Holstein-Plön (complete list) –
Gerhard II the Blind, Count (1290–1312)
John III the Mild, Count of Holstein-Plön (1312–1316, 1350–1359), of Holstein-Kiel (1316–1359)
Gerhard IV, Count (1312–1323)
Gerhard V, Count (1323–1350)

Holstein-Rendsburg (complete list) –
Henry I, Count (1290–1304)
Gerhard III the Great, Count (1304–1340)
Henry II of Iron, co-Count (1340–1384)
Nicholas I, co-Count (1340–1397)
Albert II, co-Count (1384–1397)
Gerhard VI, co-Count (1384–1404)

Holstein-Segeberg –
Adolph V, co-Count of Holstein-Kiel (1263–1273), Count of Holstein-Segeberg (1273–1308)
Adolph VII, Count (1308–1315)
Albert II, Count (1397–1403)

Prince-bishopric of Lübeck (complete list) –
Burkhard of Serkem, Prince-bishop (1276–1317)
Henry II, Prince-bishop (1317–1341)
John IV, Prince-bishop (1341–1350)
Bertram Cremon, Prince-bishop (1350–1377)
Nicholas I, Prince-bishop (1377–1379)
Conrad III of Geisenheim, Prince-bishop (1379–1386)
John V of Klenedenst, Prince-bishop (1386–1387)
Eberhard I, Prince-bishop (1387–1399)
John VI, Prince-bishop (1399–1420)

Free City of Lübeck (complete list) –
Bernhard von Coesfeld, Mayor (1299–1301)
Johann Runese, Mayor (1292, 1299–1317)
, Mayor (1301–1341)
, Mayor (1301–1323)
, Mayor (1308–1310)
, Mayor (1302)
Arnold Pape, Mayor (1314–1319)
Marquard Vorrade, Mayor (1302–1307)
Hinrich Pleskow, Mayor (1320–1340)
Hinrich von Wittenborg, Mayor (1318–1321)
, Mayor (1312–1338)
Konrad von Attendorn, Mayor (1324–1339)
Hermann Warendorp, Mayor (1328–1333)
Marquard von Coesfeld, Mayor (1341–1342)
, Mayor (1365–1367)
, Mayor (1340–1342)
, Mayor (1347)
, Mayor (1363)
, Mayor (1342)
, Mayor (1347)
Bertram Heideby, Mayor (1343)
, Mayor (1351)
Hinrich Pleskow, Mayor (1357)
Johann Wittenborg, Mayor (1360)
, Mayor (1359)
Johannes Perzeval, Mayor (1363)
, Mayor (1364)
, Mayor (1370)
, Mayor (1386)
Bruno von Warendorp, Mayor (1367)
, Mayor (1382)
, Mayor (1373)
, Mayor (1390)
, Mayor (1392)
, Mayor (1397)
Johann Lüneburg, Mayor (1392)
, Mayor (1393)
, Mayor (1400–1425)

Principality of Lüneburg (complete list) –
Otto II the Strict, Prince (1277–1330)
Otto III, Prince (1330–1352)
William II, Prince (1330–1369)
Magnus II of the Necklace, Prince of Lüneburg (1369–1373), Prince of Brunswick-Wolfenbüttel (1369–1373)
Albert of Saxe-Wittenberg, co-Prince (1370–1385)
Wenceslaus of Saxe-Wittenberg, co-Prince (1370–1388)
Bernard I, co-Prince of Lunenburg (1388–1409, 1428–1434), Prince of Brunswick-Wolfenbüttel (1400–1428)
Henry I the Mild, co-Prince of Lüneburg (1388–1416), co-Prince of Brunswick-Wolfenbüttel (1400–1409)

Prince-Archbishopric of Magdeburg (complete list) –
Burkhard II of Blankenburg, Prince-archbishop (1295–1305)
Henry III, Prince of Anhalt-Aschersleben, Prince-archbishop (1305–1307)
Burkhard III of Mansfeld-Schrapglau, Prince-archbishop (1307–1325)
Heideke of Erssa, Prince-archbishop (1326–1327)
Otto of Hesse, Prince-archbishop (1327–1361)
Dietrich Kagelwit, Prince-archbishop (1361–1367)
Albert II of Sternberg, Prince-archbishop (1367–1372)
Peter Gelvto, Prince-archbishop (1372–1381)
Louis of Meissen, Prince-archbishop (1381–1382)
Frederick II of Hoym, Prince-archbishop (1382)
Albert III of Querfurt, Prince-archbishop (1382–1403)

Mecklenburg (complete list) –
Henry I the Pilgrim, Lord (1264–1275, 1299–1302)
Henry II the Lion, Lord (1290–1329)
Albert II the Great, Lord of Mecklenburg (1329–1347), Duke of Mecklenburg-Schwerin (1347–1379)

Duchy of Mecklenburg-Schwerin (complete list) –
Albert II the Great, Lord of Mecklenburg (1329–1347), Duke of Mecklenburg-Schwerin (1347–1379)
Henry III, Duke (1379–1383)
Magnus I, Duke (1379–1384)
Albert III, Duke (1384–1412)
Albert IV, Duke (1384–1388)
John IV, Duke (1384–1422)
Eric I, Duke (1396–1397)

Mecklenburg-Stargard (complete list) –
John I, Duke (1352–1392/93)
Albert I, co-Duke (1392/93–1397)
John II, co-Duke (1392/93–1416)
Ulrich I, co-Duke (1392/93–1417)

County of Oldenburg (complete list) –
Otto II, Count (1272–1301)
John II, Count (1278–1305)
, Count (1302–1323)
, Count (1305–1345)
, Count (1331–1356)
Conrad I, Count (1345–1368)
, Count (1368–1386)
, Count (1386–1420)
Christian V, Count (1368–1398)
, Count (1398–1423)

Lordship of Rostock –
Nicholas I the Child, Lord (1282–1314)

Saxe-Lauenburg (complete list) –
Albert III, co-Duke of Saxony (1282–1296), Duke of Saxe-Lauenburg (1296–1303), of Saxe-Ratzeburg (1303–1308)
John II, co-Duke of Saxony (1282–1296), Duke of Saxe-Lauenburg (1296–1303), of Saxe-Mölln (1303–1322)
Eric I, co-Duke of Saxony (1282–1296), Duke of Saxe-Lauenburg (1296–1303), of Saxe-Bergedorf (1303–1321), of Saxe-Ratzeburg (1308–1338)

Saxe-Bergedorf (complete list) –
Eric I, co-Duke of Saxony (1282–1296), Duke of Saxe-Lauenburg (1296–1303), of Saxe-Bergedorf (1303–1321), of Saxe-Ratzeburg (1308–1338)

Saxe-Mölln (complete list) –
John II, co-Duke of Saxony (1282–1296), Duke of Saxe-Lauenburg (1296–1303), of Saxe-Mölln (1303–1322)
Elizabeth of Holstein-Rendsburg, Regent (1322–1330)
Albert IV, Duke (1322–1343)
John III, Duke (1343–1356)
Albert V, Duke (1356–1370)
Eric III, Duke (1370–1401)

Saxe-Ratzeburg (complete list) –
Albert III, co-Duke of Saxony (1282–1296), Duke of Saxe-Lauenburg (1296–1303), of Saxe-Ratzeburg (1303–1308)
Margaret of Brandenburg, Duchess (1308–1315)
Eric I, co-Duke of Saxony (1282–1296), Duke of Saxe-Lauenburg (1296–1303), of Saxe-Bergedorf (1303–1321), of Saxe-Ratzeburg (1308–1338)
Eric II, Duke (1338–1368)
Eric IV, Duke of Saxe-Ratzeburg (1368–1401), co-Duke of Saxe-Lauenburg (1401–1411/12)

Werle (complete list) –
Nicholas II, Lord of Werle-Parchim (1291–1294), of Werle (1294–1316)

Werle-Goldberg (complete list) –
John III Ruoden, Lord (1316–1350)
Nicholas IV the Pig-Eyed, Lord (1350–1354)
John IV, Lord (1354–1374)

Werle-Güstrow (complete list) –
John II the Bald, Lord (1316–1337)
Nicholas III Staveleke, Lord (1337–1360)
John V, co-Lord (1360–1378)
Lorenz, co-Lord (1360–1393/94)
John VII, co-Lord (1393/94–1414)
Balthasar, co-Lord (1393/94–1421)

Werle-Waren (complete list) –
Bernard II, Lord (1337–1382)
John VI, Lord (1382–1395)
Nicholas V, co-Lord (1395–1408)
Christopher, co-Lord (1395–1425)

Upper Saxon

Saxe-Wittenberg/ Electorate of Saxony (complete list) –
Rudolph I, Duke (1298–1356), Elector (1356)
Rudolph II the Blind, Elector (1356–1370)
Wenceslaus I, Elector (1370–1388)
Rudolf III, Elector (1388–1419)

Anhalt-Aschersleben (complete list) –
Otto I, co-Prince (1270–1304)
Otto II, Prince (1304–1315)

Anhalt-Bernburg (complete list) –
Bernhard II, Prince (1287–1323)
Bernhard III, Prince (1323–1348)
Bernhard IV, Prince (1348–1354)
Henry IV, Prince (1354–1374)
Otto III, Prince (1374–1404)

Anhalt-Zerbst (complete list) –
Albert I, Prince (1298–1316)
Albert II, co-Prince (1316–1362)
Albert III, co-Prince (1359)
Waldemar I, co-Prince (1316–1368)
John II, co-Prince (1362–1382)
Waldemar II, co-Prince (1368–1371)
Waldemar III, co-Prince (1382–1391)
Sigismund I, co-Prince of Anhalt-Zerbst (1382–1396), Prince of Anhalt-Dessau (1396–1405)
Albert IV, co-Prince of Anhalt-Zerbst (1382–1396), Prince of Anhalt-Köthen (1396–1423)

Anhalt-Dessau (complete list) –
Sigismund I, co-Prince of Anhalt-Zerbst (1382–1396), Prince of Anhalt-Dessau (1396–1405)

Margraviate of Brandenburg-Stendal (complete list) –
Conrad, co-Margrave (1266–1304)
Otto IV of the Arrow, co-Margrave (1266–1308/09)
Henry I Lackland, co-Margraviate of Brandenburg-Stendal (1294–1317), of Brandenburg (1317–1318)
Waldemar I the Great, co-Margraviate of Brandenburg-Stendal (1308–1317), of Brandenburg (1317–1319)

Margraviate of Brandenburg-Salzwedel (complete list) –
Herman I the Tall, co-Margrave (1298/99–1308)
John V the Illustrious, co-Margrave (1308–1317)

Margraviate/ Electorate of Brandenburg (complete list) –
House of Ascania
Henry I Lackland, Margraviate of Brandenburg-Stendal (1294–1317), of Brandenburg (1317–1318)
Waldemar I the Great, Margraviate of Brandenburg-Stendal (1308–1317), of Brandenburg (1317–1319)
Henry II the Child, Margraviate of Brandenburg (1319–1320)
House of Wittelsbach
Louis I the Brandenburger, Margrave (1323–1351)
Louis II the Roman, Margrave (1351–1356), Elector (1356–1365)
Otto VII the Lazy, Margrave (1351–1356), Elector (1356–1373)
House of Luxemburg
Wenceslaus, Elector (1373–1378)
Sigismund, Elector (1378–1388, 1411–1415)
Jobst, Elector (1388–1411)

Margravate of Meissen (complete list) –
Albert III, Margrave (1298–1307)
Frederick II, Margrave (1323–1349)
Frederick III, Margrave (1349–1381)
Balthasar, Margrave (1349–1382)
William I, Margrave (1349–1407)
George, Margrave (1381–1402)
William II, Margrave (1381–1425)
Frederick IV, Margrave (1381–1428)

Pomerania-Stettin (complete list) –
Otto I, co-Duke of Pomeranian (1278–c.1295), Duke of Pomerania-Stettin (c.1295–1344)
Barnim III the Great, Duke (1344–1368)
Casimir III, Duke (1368–1372)
Bogislaw VII the Older, co-Duke (1372–1404)

Pomerania-Wolgast, Pomerania-Barth (complete list) –
Bogislaw IV, co-Duke of Pomerania (1278–c.1295) Duke of Pomerania-Wolgast (c.1295–1309)
Wartislaw IV, Duke of Pomerania-Wolgast (1309–1326)
Elisabeth of Lindow-Ruppin, Regent of Pomerania-Wolgast (1326–c.1330)
Bogislaw V the Great, co-Duke of Pomerania-Wolgast (1326–1368), Duke of Pomerania-Stolp (1368–1374)
Wartislaw V the Father of the People, co-Duke of Pomerania-Wolgast (1326–1368)
Barnim IV the Good, co-Duke of Pomerania-Wolgast (1326–1365)
Bogislaw VI, co-Duke of Pomerania-Wolgast (1365–1377), Duke of Pomerania-Wolgast (1377–1393)
Wartislaw VI the One-Eyed, co-Duke of Pomerania-Wolgast (1365–1377), Duke of Pomerania-Barth (1377–1393), of Pomerania-Wolgast (1393–1394)
Barnim VI, co-Duke of Pomerania-Wolgast (1394–1405)
Wartislaw VIII, co-Duke of Pomerania-Wolgast (1393–1415)

Pomerania-Stolp, Pomerania-Stargard (complete list, complete list) –
Bogislaw V the Great, co-Duke of Pomerania-Wolgast (1326–1368), Duke of Pomerania-Stolp (1368–1374)
Casimir IV, Duke of Pomerania-Stolp (1374–1377)
Wartislaw VII, Duke of Pomerania-Stolp (1377–1394/95)
Barnim V, co-Duke of Pomerania-Stargard (1377–1394/95), of Pomerania-Stolp (1394/95–1403)
Bogislaw VIII Magnus, co-Duke of Pomerania-Stargard (1377–1394/95), of Pomerania-Stolp (1394/95–1418)

County of Stolberg (de:complete list) –
Otto I. zu Stolberg, Count (c.1305–1338)
Heinrich XVI. zu Stolberg, Count (c.1335)
Heinrich zu Stolberg, Count (?–post-1402)
Botho zu Stolberg zu Wernigerode (c.1370–1455)

Landgraviate of Thuringia (complete list) –
Albert of Habsburg, Landgrave (1298–1307)
Theodoric IV, Landgrave (1298–1307)
Frederick I, Landgrave (1298–1323)
Frederick II, Landgrave (1323–1349)
Frederick III, Landgrave (1349–1381)
William I, Landgrave (1349–1382)
Balthasar, Landgrave (1349–1406)

Swabian

Duchy of Swabia (complete list) –
John Parricida, Duke (1290–1309)

Prince-Bishopric of Augsburg (complete list) –
, Prince-bishop (1288–1302)
, Prince-bishop (1303–1307)
Friedrich I Spät of Faimingen, Prince-bishop (1309–1331)
Ulrich II of Schönegg, Prince-bishop (1331–1337)
Henry III of Schönegg, Prince-bishop (1337–1348)
Marquard of Randeck, Prince-bishop (1348–1365)
, Prince-bishop (1365–1369)
, Prince-bishop (1371–1372)
, Prince-bishop (1373–1404)

Margraviate of Baden-Eberstein (complete list) –
Frederick II, Margrave (1291–1333)
Herman IX, Margrave (1333–1353)

Margraviate of Baden-Pforzheim (complete list) –
Rudolph IV, Margrave of Baden-Pforzheim (1291–1348), of Baden-Baden (1335–1348)
Rudolph V, Margrave (1348–1361)
Rudolph VI, Margrave of Baden-Baden (1353–1372), of Baden-Pforzheim (1361–1372)

Margraviate of Baden-Baden (complete list) –
Rudolph III the Younger, co-Margrave (1288–1332)
Rudolph Hesso, Margrave (1297–1335)
Rudolph IV, Margrave of Baden-Pforzheim (1291–1348), of Baden-Baden (1335–1348)
Frederick III, Margrave (1348–1353)
Rudolph VI, Margrave of Baden-Baden (1353–1372), of Baden-Pforzheim (1361–1372)
Rudolph VII, Margrave (1372–1391)
Bernard I, Margrave of Baden-Pforzheim (1372–1431), of Baden-Baden (1391–1431), of Baden-Hachberg (1415–1431)

Margraviate of Baden-Hachberg (complete list) –
Henry III, Margrave (1289–1330)
Henry IV, Margrave (1330–1369)
Otto I, Margrave (1369–1386)
John I, co-Margrave (1386–1409)
Hesso II, co-Margrave (1386–1410)

 (complete list) –
Rudolph I, Margrave (1306)
Henry IV, co-Margrave (1312–1318)
Rudolph II, co-Margrave (1313–1352)
Otto I, co-Margrave (1318–1384)
Rudolph III, Margrave (1352–1428)

Prince-Bishopric of Constance (complete list) –
, Prince-bishop (1293–1306)
, Prince-bishop (1307–1318)
Rudolf von Montfort, Prince-bishop (1322–1334)
, Prince-bishop (1334–1344)
, Prince-bishop (1345–1351)
, Prince-bishop (1352–1356)
, Prince-bishop (1357–1383)
, Prince-bishop (1398–1406)

Ellwangen Abbey (complete list) –
Ekkehard of Schwabsberg, Prince-abbot (1278–1309)
Erenfrid of Vellberg, Prince-abbot (1309–1311)
Rudolf of Pfahlheim, Prince-abbot (1311–1332)
Kuno of Gundelfingen, Prince-abbot (1332–1367)
Albrecht Hack of Wöllstein, Prince-abbot (1367–1400)

County of Hohenberg (complete list) –
Rudolf I, Count (1298–1336)
Hugo, Count (c.1336–1354)
Rudolf III, Count (1354–1389)

Princely Abbey of Kempten (complete list) –
Konrad von Gundelfingen, Prince-abbot (1286–1302)
Hartmann IV of Rauns, Prince-abbot (1302–1315)
Wilhelm, Prince-abbot (1315–1320)
Heinrich V Unrein of Hirsendorf, Prince-abbot (1320–1331)
Burkhard III Bürck of Hasenweiler, co-Prince-abbot (1331–1346)
Konrad IV, co-Prince-abbot (1333–1346)
Gerwig I of Helmshofen, co-Prince-abbot (1333–1336)
Henry VI of Oberhofen, Prince-abbot (1346–1347)
Randger Feldeck of Roggenfurt, Prince-abbot (1347–1356)
Henry VII of Mittelburg, Prince-abbot (1356–1382)
Pilgrim I of Nordholz, Prince-abbot (1382–1386)
Frederick VI of Hirschdorf, Prince-abbot (1382–1405)

Weingarten Abbey (complete list) –
Friedrich Heller von Hellerstein, Prince-abbot (1300–1315)
Konrad II von Ibach, Prince-abbot (1315–1336)
Konrad III von Überlingen, Prince-abbot (1336–1346)
Heinrich II von Ibach, Prince-abbot (1346–1363)
Ludwig von Ibach-Heldenberg, Prince-abbot (1363–1393)
Johann I von Essendorf, Prince-abbot (1393–1418)

Barony of Westerburg (complete list) –
Siegfried of Westerburg, Baron (?–1315)
Reinhard I of Westerburg, Baron (?–1353)
John I of Westerburg (1332–1370)
Reinhard II of Westerburg (1354–1421)

County of Württemberg (complete list) –
Eberhard I, Count (1279–1325)
Ulrich III, Count (1325–1344)
Ulrich IV, Count (1344–1362)
Eberhard II, Count (1344–1392)
Eberhard III, Count (1392–1417)

Swiss Confederacy

Italy

Republic of Genoa (complete list) –
Simone Boccanegra, Doge (1339–1344, first reign)
Giovanni I di Murta, Doge (1344–1350)
Giovanni II Valente, Doge (1350–1353)
Simone Boccanegra, Doge (1356–1363, second reign)
Gabriele Adorno, Doge (1363–1370)
Domenico di Campofregoso, Doge (1370–1378)
Antoniotto I Adorno, Doge (1378, first reign)
Nicolò Guarco, Doge (1378–1383)
Antoniotto I Adorno, Doge (1383, second reign)
Federico di Pagana, Doge (1383)
Leonardo Montaldo, Doge (1383–1385)
Antoniotto I Adorno, Doge (1385–1390, third reign)
Giacomo Fregoso, Doge (1390–1391)
Antoniotto I Adorno, Doge (1391–1392, fourth reign)
Antoniotto Montaldo, Doge (1392–1393, first reign)
Pietro Fregoso, Doge (1393)
Clemente Promontorio, Doge (1393)
Francesco Giustiniano di Garibaldo, Doge (1393)
Antoniotto Montaldo, Doge (1393–1394, second reign)
Niccolo Zoagli, Doge (1394)
Antonio Guarco, Doge (1394)
Antoniotto I Adorno, Doge (1394–1396, 5th term)

Republic of Lucca –
Castruccio Castracani, Captain general (1316–1320), Lord (1320–1327), Duke (1327–1328)
Paolo Guinigi, Lord (1400–1430)

Duchy of Milan (complete list) –
Matteo I, Duke (1294–1302, 1311–1322)
Galeazzo I, Duke (1322–1327)
Azzone, Duke (1329–1339)
Luchino I, Duke (1339–1349)
Giovanni, Duke (1349–1354)
Bernabò, Duke (1354–1385)
Galeazzo II, Duke (1354–1378)
Matteo II, Duke (1354–1355)
Gian Galeazzo Visconti, Duke (1395–1402)

Principality of Orange (complete list) –
Bertrand IV, Prince (1282–c.1314)
Raymond IV, Prince (c.1314–1340)
Raymond V, Prince (1340–1393)
Mary, Princess, and John I, Prince (1393–1417)

Papal States (complete list) –
Boniface VIII, Pope (1294–1303)
Benedict XI, Pope (1303–1304)
Clement V, Pope (1305–1314)
John XXII, Pope (1316–1334)
Benedict XII, Pope (1334–1342)
Clement VI, Pope (1342–1352)
Innocent VI, Pope (1352–1362)
Urban V, Pope (1362–1370)
Gregory XI, Pope (1370–1378)
Urban VI, Pope (1378–1389)
Boniface IX, Pope (1389–1404)
From 1309 to 1376 the Papacy was based at Avignon, not Rome.

County of Savoy (complete list) –
Thomas, Count (1189–1233)
Amadeus IV, Count (1233–1253)
Boniface, Count (1253–1263)
Peter II the Little Charlemagne, Count (1263–1268)
Philip I, Count (1268–1285)
Amadeus V the Great, Count (1285–1323)
Edward the Liberal, Count (1323–1329)
Aymon the Peaceful, Count (1329–1343)
Amadeus VI the Green Count, Count (1343–1383)
Amadeus VII the Red Count, Count (1383–1391)
Amadeus VIII, Count (1391–1416), Duke (1416–1440)

References 

14th century
 
-
14th century in the Holy Roman Empire